The Anspach Fountain is an eclectic-style fountain-obelisk erected in 1897 in the centre of the Place de Brouckère/De Brouckèreplein in Brussels, Belgium. Designed by the architect , it is dedicated to the memory of Jules Anspach, a former mayor of the City of Brussels.

The monument was dismantled in 1973 following construction work on the Brussels Metro. It was reinstalled in 1981 in its current location on the /, between the / and the /, in the / neighbourhood.

History
The Anspach Fountain was designed by the architect  and  erected in 1897 in the centre of the Place de Brouckère/De Brouckèreplein, left empty by the destruction of the former Temple of the Augustinians. The fountain pays homage to Jules Anspach, mayor of the City of Brussels from 1863 to 1879, as well as promoter of the covering of the river Senne (1867–1871) and the creation of the Central Boulevards. This monument stood exactly in the axis of the Boulevard Anspach/Anspachlaan, like a regulator of traffic at the birth of the fork between the / and the Boulevard Adolphe Max/Adolphe Maxlaan. It was considered in its time the most beautiful and the grandest in the city.

The fountain was removed in 1973 to make way for access to De Brouckère metro station.

Description
Inseparable from the monumental perspective of the boulevards—and yet moved following the works of the metro—it is, through its dedication and former location, a tribute to Anspach.

Pedestal
The blue stone pedestal, decorated with a marble bas-relief depicting an allegory of The Covering of the Senne, the work of the sculptor Paul De Vigne, and chimeras sculpted by Godefroid Devreese, is surrounded by a four-lobed basin decorated with mascaron spitters made by the sculptor . On the pedestal, there are also inscriptions recalling the names of the artists and the circumstances of the monument's construction.

Obelisk
The pink granite obelisk bears at its base a white marble medallion with Anspach's image by Paul De Vigne, surrounded by bronze allegories of The Municipal Judiciary and the The Grateful City of Brussels by the sculptor Julien Dillens. The top of the obelisk bears a bronze ornament made by Pierre Braecke depicting a fortified castle surmounted by a Gothic spire decorated with finials and ending with an effigy of Saint Michael, the patron saint of the City of Brussels, slaying a dragon or demon.

See also

 History of Brussels
 Belgium in "the long nineteenth century"

References

Notes

Bibliography
 
 
 
 

Buildings and structures in Brussels
Tourist attractions in Brussels
City of Brussels
Fountains in Belgium